The germ cell nuclear factor (GCNF), also known as RTR (retinoid receptor-related testis-associated receptor) or NR6A1 (nuclear receptor subfamily 6, group A, member 1), is a protein that in humans is encoded by the NR6A1 gene.  GCNF is a member of the nuclear receptor family of intracellular transcription factors .

In adults, GCNH is expressed mainly in the germ cells of gonads and is involved in the regulation of embryogenesis and germ cell differentiation.

Its expression pattern suggests that it may be involved in neurogenesis and germ cell development. The protein can homodimerize and bind DNA, but in vivo targets have not been identified. The gene expresses three alternatively spliced transcript variants.

In cells undergoing homologous recombination during meiosis, DNA intermediates are processed as an essential step in the exchange of information between parental homologous chromosomes.  In eukaryotes the RTR complex, which consists of a type IA topoisomerase, a RecQ helicase and the structural protein RMI1, is employed in processing DNA recombination intermediates.

References

Further reading

External links 
 

Intracellular receptors
Transcription factors